Madison Elementary School is a public school located at 376 Wayne Street in the Bridgeport Public Schools District. Madison Elementary School was built in 1916 named after the fourth president under the United States Declaration of Independence, James Madison. It is considered one of the oldest schools in the Bridgeport Public Schools District.

References

External links 
 Madison Elementary School
 Madison Elementary school profile on SchoolDigger

Public elementary schools in Connecticut